Trichoptilus ceramodes is a moth of the family Pterophoridae that is found in Australia, including New South Wales and South Australia.

Original description

External links
Australian Faunal Directory
Trin Wiki

Moths of Australia
Oxyptilini
Moths described in 1886
Endemic fauna of Australia